The 2019 USA Women's Sevens was a rugby sevens tournament that takes place at Infinity Park in Glendale, Colorado between the 5-6 October 2019. It was the seventh time that the USA Women's Sevens have been held as an World Series event and was the first tournament of the 2019–20 World Rugby Women's Sevens Series.

In the cup final, the United States won their first USA Women's Sevens since the tournament became a World Series event as they defeated Australia 26–7 in the final. New Zealand came home in third place after defeating France 31–14 while England won the Challenge Trophy over Japan.

Background
The 2019 USA Women's Sevens is the first round of eight tournaments for the 2019–20 World Rugby Women's Sevens Series and the seventh since the tournament became a part of the World Series. During the off-season, qualifying for the 2020 Summer Olympics continued in the continental with England qualifying through to the Olympic Games as Great Britain with a 19-0 victory over Russia. France joined Russia in qualifying for the repcharge event.

Format
The twelve teams are drawn into three pools of four teams each with each team playing their other three opponents in their pool once. Points are awarded in each pool on the standard schedule for rugby sevens tournaments (though different from the standard in the 15-man game)—3 for a win, 2 for a draw, 1 for a loss. The top two teams from each pool advance to the Cup brackets while the top two third place teams also compete in the Cup. The remaining four teams will compete in the Challenge Trophy.

Teams
Twelve teams will compete in the tournament with eleven teams being core teams to the Sevens Series. The twelfth team, Japan was invited to the tournament.

Pool stage

Pool A

Pool B

Pool C

Knockout stage

Challenge Trophy

Fifth place

Cup

Tournament placings

Source: World Rugby

Players

Scoring leaders

Source: World Rugby 

Source: World Rugby

Dream Team
The following seven players were selected for the tournament Dream Team at the conclusion of the tournament:

See also
 World Rugby Sevens Series (for men)
 World Rugby

References

External links 
 Tournament site
 World Rugby info

2019
2019–20 World Rugby Women's Sevens Series
2019 in women's rugby union
2019 in American rugby union
rugby union
2019 rugby sevens competitions
2019 in sports in Colorado
USA Women's Sevens